The Wild Wild West television series combined James Bond with a western, and often featured numerous anachronistic gadgets. Some were recurring devices, such as West's sleeve gun or a breakaway Derringer hidden in his left and right boot heels. Others appeared in only a single episode.

Concealed on West
 Sleeve gun (a Remington Double Derringer), featured in many episodes as an unexpected concealed carry alternative to his openly carried full-sized revolver. ["The Night  of the Poisonious Posey"]. In some episodes, the ejecting arm of the device dispensed other useful gadgets, such as a tiny squirt can containing acid ("The Night of Montezuma's Hordes"), iron climbing-claws, a knife ("The Night of the Watery Death"), a pulley ("The Night of the Bubbling Death") and various blades.
 A breakaway Remington Derringer. Usually the frame (grip and trigger mechanism) was located in one hollowed-out boot heel, while the double-barrel assembly was located in the other heel; the two pieces snapped together and locked. Bullets were dispensed from a secret compartment in his belt buckle, or the chambers were pre-loaded.
 A breakaway blowtorch, hidden in the hollowed-out boot heels. ("The Night of the Raven")
 Lock pick or passkey concealed under the lapel of the Bolero-style jacket. ("The Night of the Avaricious Actuary")
 Throwing knife concealed in a pocket inside the back of the jacket, just below the collar, where West could reach it over his shoulder.
 Various explosive devices (i.e. smoke bombs, impact flares ("The Night of the Avaricious Actuary"), gas grenades, anti-lock key ("The Night of the Golden Cobra"; "The Night of the Simian Terror"), explosive putty ("The Night of the Returning Dead"; "The Night of the Egyptian Queen"; "The Night of the Spanish Curse"), acid-dissolving steel ball ("The Night of Montezuma's Hordes"; "The Night of the Tycoons"), wood-burning chemical ("The Night of the Deadly Plague"), impact explosive ("The Night of the Vipers"), etc.) carried in his jacket pockets, belt buckle, coat buttons, hat, a secret compartment in his holster and the hollowed-out heels of one or both boots. Various lengths and types of fuses were sewn into the hem of his jacket or the waistband of his trousers.
 A grappling hook attachment for his rifle. ("The Night of Montezuma's Hordes") 
 A grappling hook mechanism with a piton. ("The Night of the Juggernaut")
 A grappling hook/spindle combination silent pistol. ("The Night of the Camera")
 A glass cutter. ("The Night of the Camera")
 A flat metal barbed climbing-spike (piton) with an attached cord, cable or wire. The piton fit the muzzle of either his Derringer or revolver and was fired into a wooden beam or wall. West would then use a pulley with a handle to zip-line above obstacles. The equipment was usually carried in his jacket's many inside pockets. ("The Night of the Bubbling Death"; "The Night of the Headless Woman"; "The Night of the Fugitives")
 A set of a six-shooter pistol and Winchester Carbine decorated with metal studs. ("The Night of the Inferno"; "The Night of Montezuma's Hordes"; "The Night of the Cut-Throats")
 A small, hand-held motor-driven winch. When used in conjunction with the piton and wire, the winch could either hoist him upwards, to a building's roof for instance, or lower him into a pit. ("The Night of the Bubbling Death"; "The Night of the Headless Woman"; "The Night of the Fugitives"; "The Night of the Camera"; "The Night of the Tycoons")
 A thin, telescopic probing rod (similar to a long modern-day car antenna). When extended fully, West could probe approximately 10 feet around him. He used this to probe and trigger traps in the Secret Service training room depicted in "The Night of the Janus".
 A spring-loaded, swing-out knife blade (switchblade) beneath the toe-box of his boot. ("The Night of the Glowing Corpse"; "The Night of the Flying Pie Plate"; "The Night of the Watery Death"; "The Night of the Amnesiac")
 A glass cutter with a suction cup. A cutting arm rotated to score the glass in a complete circle and the suction cup was used to remove the cut piece. ("The Night of the Camera")
 A thin but strong wire, coiled and fitted in the inner lining of the crown of his hat; the wire had multiple uses and was even capable of sawing through a steel bar.
 A battery-powered (or spring-driven) electric drill that, in one episode, was roughly the size of a large avocado and used to assist West's escape from a metal cage.
 West's saddle horn was booby-trapped with a dynamite bullet shell. ("The Night of the Returning Dead")
 A kit bag which, when opened, inflated a big balloon to shock and disorient enemies for a few seconds. ("The Night of Fire and Brimstone")
 Bulletproof vest. ("The Night of the Thousand Eyes"; "The Night of the Cadre"; "The Night of the Glowing Corpse"; "The Night Dr. Loveless Died"; "The Night of the Arrow")
 Tear gas/smoke bombs. ("The Night of the Dancing Death")
 Package of burnable material capable of burning through locks or the bottom of man-sized birdcages. ("The Night of the Simian Terror"; "The Night of the Gruesome Games")
 A small windup noise buzzer/maker. ("The Night of the Fugitives"; "The Night of the Sabatinii Curse")
 A put together wind-up lifter. ("The Night of Miguelito's Revenge")

Aboard the train
 A remote control under a revolving table that automatically locked the door of the rail car ("The Night of the Inferno"). Similarly, a concealed panel above the revolving table that would either display a blackboard ("The Night of Miguelito's Revenge") or a map of the United States ("The Night of the Vicious Valentine"), but also concealed several pistols mounted on the panel ("The Night of the Brain"). Depending on the episode, a pistol ("The Night of the Arrow"; "The Night of the Egyptian Queen") or a shotgun (The Wild Wild West Revisited) would be hidden under the revolving table top. One episode ("The Night of the Tartar") showed that, after the statue on the revolving table-top was turned upside down, it would unlock a secret panel concealing a small wall safe.
 A metal knight statue on the desk that struck a bell when a hidden alarm triggered it after the train window was broken. ("The Night of the Egyptian Queen")
 A Chinese box that made a whistling sound like a firework — a "present" From Dr. Loveless. ("The Night Dr. Loveless Died")
 An early warning system on the back door of the rail car which activated the rail car's parlor lights. ("The Night of the Arrow)
 A mobile telegraph set concealed in a false book set on the desk ("The Night of the Bubbling death", "The Night of the Brain"). In two episodes ("The Night of the Poisonious Posey"/"The Night of the Bottomless Pit") the telegraph/Book set is on a table under one of the trains windows instead of the usual place on desk.
 A "Victorian" record player (an anachronism since this was invented nearly 10 years later – 1888).
 Two pistols on a wooden swivel-stand on desk, activated and controlled by a knob on the fireplace. ("The Night of the Bubbling Death")
 The fireplace concealed a secret escape door and an emergency flare signal; it also had concealed side panels for chemicals; a roost for carrier pigeons [see below]; and a primitive phone mouthpiece for communication with the engine ("The Night of the Eccentrics"; "The Night of the Golden Cobra"; "The Night of the Brain") and a case of fake jewels ("The Night of the Egyptian Queen"). At least one episode ("The Night of the Feathered Fury") showed a pistol concealed behind a side shelf door panel. On either side of the fireplace were decorative lion heads that spew out knockout gas when triggered ("The Night of the Big Blackmail"). Over the fireplace is hung a souvenir Aztec goddess mask ("The Night of Montezuma's Hordes").
 Several pistols, rifles, shotguns and other assorted weaponry were mounted on a concealed pull-down panel on the laboratory section of the train. A sliding closet located in the same area contained clothes and other useful paraphernalia ("The Night of the Inferno"). The other part of the laboratory car contained a stable for West's and Gordon's horses.
 A small mirrored ball that hung over the desk and could be used to induce hypnotic suggestions to amiable young women. ("The Night of the Tartar")
 Overhead billiard scoring wire and beads that connected to signal lamps on the back of the railroad car (to turn the lights off as needed). ("The Night of the Inferno")
 Cages for two carrier pigeons (named Henry and Henrietta). In the pilot episode, the cages were located above the door in the same room where West usually dressed and equipped himself. In subsequent episodes, the carrier pigeons were usually located in a compartment above the fireplace. In one episode, a carrier pigeon is carried within a valise. ("The Night of the Colonel's Ghost")
 A pet cat named Denver ("The Night of the Big Blackmail")
 A leopard cub "pet", a gift of Vana Snigh. ("The Night of the Golden Cobra")
 A toy train set along with life-sized cutouts of West's and Gordon's heads. ("The Night of the Big Blackmail")
 A wooden model of an armored tank (based on the tank in "The Night of the Doomsday Formula"). ("The Night of the Colonel's Ghost")
 A surprise joke snake in the cigar humidor. ("The Night of the Iron Fist")
 A life-size dummy of Artemus Gordon. ("The Night Dr. Loveless Died")
 A Bunsen burner in the laboratory car that, when turned up, activates an outside distress flare. ("The Night of the Falcon")
 A miniature piano. ("The Night of the Cut-throats"; "The Night of the Janus")
 A ventriloquist's dummy used by Artemus Gordon to throw his voice. ("The Night of the Shedwick Curse")
 An "unwanted" souvenir book called Encyclopedia of Party Games. ("The Night of Gruesome Games")
 An "unwanted" souvenir metal key of Justice, Nevada ("The Night of the Poisonous Posey")
 A pair of candlesticks. ("The Night of the Egyptian Queens")
 A typewriter. ("The Night of the Camera")

Other gadgets
 Elastic wire in a watch. ("The Night of the Poisonous Posey")
 An exploding pocket watch.
 Exploding billiard balls (the cue ball in the series' pilot episode, but sometimes other balls as well). ("The Night of the Inferno" (pilot episode); "The Night of the camera")
 Cue stick with a rapier hidden inside. ("The Night of the Inferno" (pilot episode))
 Cue stick that fires bullets. ("The Night of the Inferno" (pilot episode))
 Stagecoach with two ejector seats (one inside and one outside the coach (a nod to James Bond's 007 Aston Martin) and a hook to immobilize killers. ("The Night the Wizard Shook the Earth")
 A chemical compound invented by Artemus Gordon that could support a man's weight for between 20 seconds to one minute. ("The Night of the Glowing Corpse"; "The Night of the Big Blackmail")
 An explosive compound invented by Artemus Gordon that goes off when exposed to heat. ("The Night of the Juggernaut")
 A chemical liqued that can burn leather ("The Night of the Poisonous Posey")
Smoke bomb disguised as a wine cork("The Night of the Poisonous Posey")
 An anti-lock explosive. ("The Night of the Golden Cobra"; "The Night of the Kraken")
 A telegraph mechanism in a cane.
 A brass lockpick carried by Artemius Gordon ["The Night of the Raven"]
 A lock pick in a cane. ("The Night of the Shedwick Curse")
 A blow torch disguised as a cigar.
 A miniature blowtorch. ("The Night of the Turncoat")
 A miniature grenade. ("The Night of the Doomsday Formula")
 A miniature record player that plays realistic gunshots ("The Night of Fire and Brimstone") or music ("The Night of the Doomsday Formula").
 A combination flare and whistle. ("The Night of the Doomsday Formula")
 Clockwork-powered lock-picking device key opener for locks. ("The Night of the Cadre"; "The Night of the Arrow"; "The Night of the Headless Woman"; "The Night of the Vipers")
 Rubber mask disguises (similar to Mission Impossible) for both agents ("The Night of the Brian") and villains ("The Night of the Pelican").
 A net-throwing bazooka. ("The Night of the Big Blast")
 A walking stick that doubled as a mortar ("The Night of the Bottomless Pit"); carried by Artemius Gordon ("The Night the Wizard Shook the Earth";"The Night of the Eccentrics"] who used it to disarm a would be gunman trying to kill James west ("The Wild Wild West Revisited")	
 Diving helmet. ("The Night of the Kraken")
 Gas mask with a five-minute air supply. ("The Night of the Glowing Corpse")
 Gas mask carried by Artemius Gordon. ("The Night of the Flying Pie Plate";"The Night of the Bottomless Pit")
 Knockout gas in a ball. ("The Night of the Brain")
 Knockout gas in a balloon. ("The Night of the Cadre"; "The Night Dr. Loveless Died"; "The Night of the Kraken")
 Knockout gas in a box ("The Night of the Pelican")
 Knockout gas in a cane. ("The Night of the Burning Diamond")
Knockout gas in a cigar.("The Night of the Bottomless Pit")
 Knockout gas in a clay pipe. ("The Night of the Deadly Bubble"; "The Night of the Headless Woman")
 Knockout gas in glass dejohns. ("The Night of the Cadre")
 Knockout gas water in a seltzer bottle. ("The Night of the Feathered Fury")
 A revolver bullet/flare to illuminate a dark cave or call for help. ("The Night of the Returning Dead"; "The Night of the Arrow")
 A magnetized coin that explodes when exposed to heat. ("The Night of the Watery Death")
 A cigar that, when thrown to the ground, produces shock and smoke effects. ("The Night of the Colonel's Ghost")
 Shock/stun smoke pellets. ("The Night of the Vipers")
 Wine bottle/smoke/shock grenades. ("The Night of the Bubbling Death")
 Wine bottle/joke snake. ("The Night of the Bubbling Death")
 Wine bottle/smoke. ("The Night of the Bubbling Death")
 Escape basket. ("The Night of the Bubbling Death")
 Hammer/jimmy kit concealed in jacket. ("The Night of the Bubbling Death")
 Smoke screen escape packet. ("The Night of the Bubbling Death")
 Smoke screen in a prop human skull. ("The Night of the Underground Terror")
 Burning strips to destroy metal bars. ("The Night of the Undead"; "The Night of the Simian Terror")
 Trick wagon. ("The Night of the Cadre"; "The Night of the Fugitives")
 A mechanical wind-up bomb ("The Night of the Spanish Curse")
 A mechanical wind up butterfly/bomb. ("The Night of Miguelito's Revenge")
 A mechanical snake. ("The Night of the Spanish Curse")

Gadgets used or invented by villains
 A metallic blowgun with telescopic rifle sight ("The Night the Wizard Shook the Earth")
 A blowgun ("The Night of the golden Cobra")
A crossbow ("The Night the Wizard Shook the Earth"/"The Night of the Vicious Valentime")
 A device to trigger earthquakes. ("The Night of the Human Trigger")
 Brainwashing techniques using intense light and sound. ("The Night of the Steel Assassin"; "The Night of the Howling Light")
 A Computer dating machine  ("The Night of the Vicious Valentime")
 A cyborg. ("The Night of the Steel Assassin")
 Androids. ("The Night of Miguelito's Revenge")
 A flamethrower cannon. ("The Night of the Flaming Ghost")
 An early flamethrower. ("The Night of the Circus of Death")
 Life-size steam-powered puppets. ("The Night of the Puppeteer")
 Jars that preserved disembodied human brains to draw upon their knowledge and psychic force. ("The Night of the Druid's Blood")
 Chemical-treated clothing that burned its victims. ("The Night of the Druid's Blood")
 A germ that paralyzes its victims for 48 hours. ("The Night of the Sudden Plague")
 An explosive powerful enough to destroy city blocks prototype to TNT. ("The Night the Wizard Shook the Earth")
 A metal cage connected to a lightning rod. ("The Night of a Thousand Eyes")
 The Juggernaut: a steam-powered, wedge-shaped tank with a battering ram. ("The Night of the Juggernaut")
 Gatling Machine guns ( "The Night of the Death Maker")
 A long undersea air filled gutta-perra mechaniel arm that could destroy small boats("The Night of the Kraken")
 A potion, made from liquefied diamonds, which enabled a man to move so fast as to be invisible. ("The Night of the Burning Diamond")
 An LSD-like hallucinogen, capable of driving men into fits of killing madness. ("The Night of the Murderous Spring")
 A cathode-ray tube (television), plus prototypes of the airplane, the automobile and penicillin. ("The Night the Wizard Shook the Earth")
 A torpedo disguised as a dragon capable of homing on a radio signal. ("The Night of the Watery Death")
 A force field that disintegrates anything that comes in contact with it. ("The Night of the Watery Death")
 A drug capable of shrinking a man down to a height of six inches. ("The Night of the Raven")
 An exoskeleton suit of armor. ("The Night of the Green Terror")
 A device that triggers tidal waves. ("The Night of the Deadly Bubble")
 Automatic barred doors. ("The Night of the Deadly Bubble"; "The Night of the Undead", "The Night of the Fugitives")
 A potion that turns humans into zombies. ("The Night of the Undead")
 A sonic device that allowed paintings to be used as portals to other dimensions. ("The Night of the Surreal McCoy")
 Crystals that, when surgically implanted inside the brain and shattered by a high-pitched noise, caused the subject to turn into a criminal. ("The Night of the Cadre"; "The Night of the Winged Terror — Part I"; "The Night of the Winged Terror — Part II")
 A giant falcon-shaped cannon, capable of devastating a small town with a single shot. ("The Night of the Falcon")
 A giant tuning fork that created destructive sound waves. ("The Night of the Avaricious Actuary")
 A recording phonograph. ("The Night of the Avaricious Actuary")
 A locomotive modified with a large battering ram to collide with oncoming trains and derail them. ("The Night of the Deadly Bed")
 Re-animated human corpses (similar to the Frankenstein Monster) turned into human bombs. ("The Night of the Big Blast")
 Dungeons. ("The Night of the Eccentrics"; "The Night of Montezuma's Hordes"; "The Night of the Spanish Curse")
 A kinetoscope (The Night of the Feathered Fury;The Night of the Big Blackmail")
 A pair of revolving blades. ("The Night of the Big Blackmail")
 A steam-powered piston used to block entrance to safes. ("The Night of the Big Blackmail")
 A pair of large metal hands with a deadly electric field. ("The Night of the Eccentrics")
 A large, live-action periscope for spying. ("The Night of the Eccentrics")
 A flying "pie plate" (a balloon filled with flares). ("The Night of the Flying Pie Plate")
A fake Flying saucer "Pie Plate" made of Wood ("The Night of the Flying Pie Plate")
 A mechaniel Siren machine ("The Night of the Flying Pie Plate")
 Knockout gas in a door knocker ("The Night of the Headless Woman")
 Knockout gas masks. ("The Night of the Flying Pie Plate"; The Night of the Egyptian Queen)
 Knockout gas pistols. ("The Night of the Flying Pie Plate"; The Night of the Egyptian Queen)
 Knockout drug pistol. ("The Night of the Feathered Fury")
 Stagecoaches with knockout gas tubes. ("The Night of the Masks"; "The Night of the Diva")
Poison spiders ("The Night of the Poisonous Posey"/"The Night of the Egyptian Queen")("A nod to the James Bond Movie "Dr No[!])
Artifical Iron Hand ["The Night of the Iron Fist"]
 Heavy iron artificial leg(s). ("The Night of the Glowing Corpse"; "The Night of the Bottomless Pit")
Iron glove/guanlett.("The Night of the Poisonous Posey")
 Bomb gavel. ("The Night of the Poisonous Posey")
Brick Wall disguised as a door ("The Night of the Poisonous Posey")
 Poison-tipped diamond. ("The Night of the Poisonous Posey")
 Revolving gun organ pipes. ("The Night of the Poisonous Posey")
 A robotic suit of medieval armor. ("The Night of the Green Terror")
 Explosive glass bulbs. ("The Night of the Green Terror")
 Explosive mace head. ("The Night of the Green Terror")
 Balloon-borne powder that sets forest fires. ("The Night of the Green Terror")
 A small bomb ("The Night of the Braine")
 A drug that renders its victims immobile for five minutes. ("The Night of the Braine")
 A backwards-firing pistol. ("The Night of the Brain"; "The Night of the Bogus Bandits"; "The Night of the Winged Terror – Part 1")
 An ejection chair-seat. ("The Night of the Brain"; "The Night of the Hangman")
 Doubles of world leaders. ("The Night of the Brain"; The Wild Wild West Revisited)
 Steam-powered wheelchair with rockets and impaling spikes. ("The Night of the Brain")
 A magnetic sea mine. ("The Night of the Kraken")
 An undersea fortress. ('"The Night of the Deadly Bubble"; "The Night of the Kraken")
 Copies of the White House rooms. ("The Night of the Brain"; The Night of the Big Blackmail")
 Windows with sliding bars/barriers. ("The Night of the Raven"; "The Night of the Colonels Ghost"; "The Night of the Fugitives")
Doors with sliding barriers ("The Night of the Poisonous Posey")
 Swinging axe pendulum. ("The Night of the Deadly Blossom")
 A combination flare and whistle. ("The Night Dr. Loveless Died")
 2 wireless remote controlled rockets ["The Night of the Steel Assassian"]
 Anti-ship rockets. ("The Night of the Deadly Blossom"; "The Night of the Pelican")
 A circus cannon that can be used as an escape vehicle. ("The Night of Miguelito's Revenge")
 Phosgene gas. ("The Night of the Shedwick Curse"; "The Night Dr. Loveless Died")
 Booby-trapped knife/chair. ("The Night of the Tottering Tontine"; "The Night of the Falcon")
 Armored wagon with cannon. ("The Night of the Vipers")
 A booby-trapped bed. ("The Night of the Inferno'; "The Night of the Shedwick Curse")
 A revolving wall/bed. ("The Night of the Raven"/ "The Night of the Shedwick Curse"){Note the Revelving wall was used in an episode of Giligan island where the castawayd meet the mad scientist Dr Boris Baroloff(!)
 An anti-aging serum that instead turns those who are injected with it 50 years older. ("The Night of the Shedwick Curse")
 Large bird cages/prisoner cages. (("The Night the Wizard Shook the Earth"; "The Night of the Feathered Fury"; "The Night of Miguelito's Revenge"; "The Night of the Simian Terror"; "The Night of the Gruesome Games"; "The Night of the Diva")
 Grenades. ("The Night of the Pelican")
 Miniature rockets. ("The Night of the Brian"; The Night of the Gruesome Games")
 Miniature grenades. ("The Night of the Falcon"; "The Night of the Feathered Fury"; "The Night of the Tycoons")
 Bulletproof armor. ("The Night of the Spanish Curse")
 An amplified drum. ("The Night of the Spanish Curse")
 A $600.00 man and woman whose strength has been increased 1,000% via robotic pulley implants (The Wild West Revisited, a spoof of the popular The Six Million Dollar Man and The Bionic Woman TV series)

References